Capilla del Señor (Chapel of the Lord), is a city located  in the northern part of Buenos Aires Province, Argentina. It is the administrative seat of Exaltación de la Cruz Partido; which is bounded by the Zárate, Campana, Pilar, Luján, San Antonio de Areco, San Andrés de Giles partidos. It has been designated by the former president Carlos Saúl Menem as the "First National Historical Town" in Argentina. It is located 82 km from Buenos Aires, 24 km from Zárate, 27 km from Pilar, 30 km  from Campana and Luján, 47 km from San Antonio de Areco, and 49 km from San Andrés de Giles.

External links 

 Capilla del Señor :: Institutional Web Site (in spanish)

Populated places in Buenos Aires Province